Batangas held its local elections on May 13, 2019 as part of the 2019 general election. Voters will select candidates for all local positions: a town mayor, vice mayor and town councilors, as well as members of the Sangguniang Panlalawigan, the vice-governor, governor and for the six districts of Batangas.

Provincial elections

Governor
Incumbent Hermilando Mandanas ran for reelection.

Vice Governor
Incumbent Sofronio Ona, Jr. did not run for his second term, he instead ran for Mayor of Calaca, Batangas. Running for the position were Reynan Bool and former Vice Governors Jose Antonio Leviste II and Richard Recto.

Congressional Elections

1st District
Eileen Ermita-Buhain was the incumbent. Her opponent was former congressman Conrado Apacible

2nd District
Raneo Abu was the incumbent

3rd District
Incumbent Ma. Theresa Collantes ran for reelection. Her main opponents were Nestor Burgos, former Board Member Ma. Chona Dimayuga and Jose Gabriel Reyes. Collantes and Dimayuga ran under two factions of PDP-Laban. Collantes ran under the Pimentel Wing while Dimayuga was under the Garcia Wing.

4th District
Lianda Bolilia was the incumbent. Her opponent was former representative Mark Llandro Mendoza.

5th District (Batangas City)

6th District (Lipa City)
Incumbent Vilma Santos-Recto ran for reelection. Her main opponent was incumbent Lipa Mayor Meynardo Sabili.

Provincial Board Members

1st District

|-

|-
|colspan=5 bgcolor=black|

|-

2nd District

|-

|-
|colspan=5 bgcolor=black|

|-

3rd District

|-

|-
|colspan=5 bgcolor=black|

|-

|-

|-

|-

4th District

|-

|-
|colspan=5 bgcolor=black|

|-

5th District

|-

|-
|colspan=5 bgcolor=black|

|-

6th District

|-

|-

|-
|colspan=5 bgcolor=black|

|-

City and municipal elections
All municipalities of Batangas, Batangas City, Lipa City and Tanauan City will elect mayor and vice-mayor this election. The candidates for mayor and vice mayor with the highest number of votes wins the seat; they are voted separately, therefore, they may be of different parties when elected. Below is the list of mayoralty and vice-mayoralty candidates of each city and municipalities per district

1st District
Municipality: Balayan, Calaca, Calatagan, Lemery, Lian, Nasugbu, Taal, Tuy

Balayan
Incumbent Emmanuel Salvador Fronda II is running for reelection. His opponent is incumbent Vice Mayor Joel Arada. Aranda would later withdrew his candidacy and was substituted by Nilo Pamintuan.

≥u

Incumbent Joel Arada is running for mayor. His party nominated Francisco Ramos. His opponent is Rita Abiad.

≥u

Calaca
Incumbent Sofronio Manuel Ona is not running. His brother, incumbent Vice Governor Sofronio Ona, Jr. is his party's nominee.

≥u

Incumbent Renante Macalindong is running for reelection unopposed.

Calatagan

≥u

Incumbent Andrea del Rosario is running for reelection.

≥u

Lemery
Incumbent Eulalio Alilio is running for reelection.

≥u

Incumbent Monnete Rosales-Gamo is running for reelection.

≥u

Lian
Incumbent Isagani Bolompo is running for reelection

≥u

Incumbent Exequiel Bonuan is running for reelection.

≥u

Nasugbu
Incumbent Antonio Jose Barcelon is running for reelection. His opponent is former mayor Raymund Apacible. Initially, former mayor Rosario Apacible is running against Barcelon, however she withdrew her candidacy and substituted by his son.

≥u

Incumbent Larry Albanio is running for reelection.

≥u

Taal
Incumbent Fulgencio Mercado is running for reelection.

≥u

Incumbent Jovito Albufera is running for reelection.

≥u

Tuy
Incumbent Mayor Jose Jecerell Cerrado is term-limited and is running for Vice Mayor.

≥u

Incumbent Elsie Calingasan is running for Mayor.

≥u

2nd District
Municipality: Bauan, Lobo, Mabini, San Luis, San Pascual, Tingloy

Bauan
Mayor Julian Casapao who elevates the Mayorship after the death of Mayor Herminigildo Dolor is opted to run as Vice Mayor.

≥u

Vice Mayor Ronald Cruzat who elevates the Vice Mayorship after the death of Mayor Herminigildo Dolor is opted to run as councilor.

≥u

Lobo
Incumbent Gaudioso Manalo is running for reelection. His opponent is former Mayor Efren Diona.

≥u

≥u

Mabini

≥u

Incumbent Pablo Villanueva, Jr. is running for reelection.

≥u

San Luis
Incumbent Samuel Noel Ocampo is running for reelection. However, Mayor Samuel Noel Ocampo died on June 17, 2019, days before he was about to take oath. The winning Vice Mayor Danilo Medina will assume as Mayor.

≥u

Incumbent Danilo Medina is running for reelection. However, due to the death of the winning Mayor Samuel Noel Ocampo, the winning Vice Mayor Danilo Medina will assume as Mayor. The winning first councilor Oscarlito Hernandez will assume the post of Vice Mayor.

≥u

San Pascual

≥u

Incumbent Antonio Dimayuga is running for mayor.

≥u

Tingloy
Incumbent Mark Lawrence Alvarez is not running. His father, former Mayor Lauro Alvarez is his party's nominee.

≥u

≥u

3rd District
City: Tanauan City
Municipality: Agoncillo, Alitagtag, Balete, Cuenca, Laurel, Malvar, Mataas na Kahoy, San Nicolas, Santa Teresita, Santo Tomas, Talisay

Tanauan City
Incumbent Mayor Jhoanna Corona-Villamor, who assumed office following the assassination of Mayor Antonio Halili, is running for Provincial Board Member, switching places with his father, incumbent Board Member Alfredo Corona. His opponents are former Mayor Sonia Torres-Aquino, former DFA Lipa Director Jesusa "Nancy" Garcia, Mary Angeline Halili, the daughter of the slain Mayor Antonio Halili, and Marcos Valdez. Pedrito Carandang withdrew from the race.

≥u

Incumbent Vice Mayor Benedicto Corona, who assumed office following the assassination of Mayor Antonio Halili, is running for City Councilor. His party nominated former Vice Mayor Julius Caesar Platon II, the son of slain former Mayor Cesar Platon; however, Platon died due to heart attack on November 19, 2018. Marissa Tabing, wife of incumbent councilor Lim Tabing, withdrew her candidacy for councilor to become Platon's substitute. Her opponents are former City Administrator Herminigildo Trinidad, Jr., Mary Jane Reyes, and Salvador Quimo.

≥u

Agoncillo

≥u

≥u

Alitagtag

≥u

≥u

Balete
Incumbent Wilson Maralit assumed office after the assassination of former Mayor Leovino Hidalgo.

≥u

≥u

Cuenca

≥u

Incumbent Romulo Cuevas is running for reelection.

≥u

Laurel
Incumbent Randy James Amo is term-limited and is running for Board Member.

≥u

≥u

Malvar
Incumbent Cristeta Reyes is running for reelection. Her opponent is incumbent Vice Mayor Alberto Lat. Lat assumed office after the Office of the Ombudsman dismissed Mayor Cristeta Reyes. Former Mayor Carlito Reyes originally ran for the position since Reyes was perpetually disqualified from holding public office. But, he withdrew from his candidacy and substituted by his sister-in-law who reassumed the mayorship.

≥u

Incumbent Alberto Lat is running for Mayor. He assumed the mayorship after the dismissal of Mayor Cristeta Reyes. But he reassumed the position of Vice Mayor. His party nominated incumbent Senior Councilor Matt Louie Aranda.

≥u

Mataasnakahoy
Incumbent Gualberto Silva is running for reelection.

≥u

Incumbent Janet Ilagan is running for Mayor. Her husband, former Mayor Jay Ilagan is her party's nominee.

≥u

San Nicolas

≥u

≥u

Santa Teresita
Incumbent Ma. Aurea Segunial is term-limited and is running for Vice Mayor. Her husband, Norberto is her party's nominee. His opponent is incumbent Vice Mayor Carlos Bathan.

≥u

Incumbent Carlos Bathan is term-limited and is running for Mayor.

≥u

Santo Tomas
Incumbent Edna Sanchez is running for reelection.

≥u

Incumbent Armenius Silva is running for reelection.

≥u

Talisay

≥u

≥u

4th District
Municipality: Ibaan, Padre Garcia, Rosario, San Jose, San Juan, Taysan

Ibaan
Incumbent Mayor Juan Toreja is term-limited. His party nominated former Mayor Artemio Chua. His main opponent is incumbent Vice Mayor Edralyn Joy Salvame.

≥u

Incumbent Edralyn Joy Salvame is running for Mayor. Her party nominated incumbent Councilor Juvy Mendoza. Her opponents are incumbent councilors Socrates Arellano, Cesar Marasigan and Pio Roberto. 

≥u

Padre Garcia
Incumbent Michael Angelo Rivera is not running. His wife, Celsa is his party's nominee. Her opponent is former ABC President Nicetas Amante.

≥u

Incumbent Noel Cantos is running for reelection.

≥u

Rosario
Both Mayor Manuel Alvarez and Vice Mayor Leovigildo Morpe will stand unopposed for reelection.

≥u

≥u

San Jose
Incumbent Valentino Patron is running for reelection.

≥u

Incumbent Entiquio Briones is running for reelection

≥u

San Juan
Incumbent Mayor Rodolfo Manalo is term-limited. His wife, Teresita is his party's nominee. Her opponents are Pastor Noel Castillo and incumbent Vice Mayor Ildebrando Salud.

≥u

Incumbent Ildebrando Salud is running for Mayor. His party nominated incumbent councilor Florencio De Chavez. His opponents are Ruel Carandang and former Vice Mayor Octavio Antonio Marasigan.

≥u

Taysan
Incumbent Grande Gutierrez is running for reelection. His opponent is former Mayor Victor Portugal, Jr.

≥u

Incumbent Marianito Perez is running for reelection.

≥u

5th District
City: Batangas City

Batangas City
Incumbent Mayor Beverley Rose Dimacuha and Vice Mayor Emilio Francisco Berberabe, Jr. will stand unopposed for reelection.

≥u

≥u

6th District
City: Lipa City

Lipa City

References

2019 Philippine local elections
Elections in Batangas
May 2019 events in the Philippines
2019 elections in Calabarzon